The Sri Lanka national cricket team toured England in the 1990 season to play six first-class matches and two limited overs matches against county teams.

The first-class fixtures were against:
 Glamorgan at Eugene Cross Park, Ebbw Vale
 Nottinghamshire at Cleethorpes
 Warwickshire at Edgbaston
 Sussex at Hove
 Lancashire at Old Trafford
 Hampshire at Southampton

External sources
CricketArchive – tour itineraries

Annual reviews
 Playfair Cricket Annual 1991
 Wisden Cricketers' Almanack 1991

1990 in cricket
1990 in English cricket
1990
International cricket competitions from 1988–89 to 1991
1990 in Sri Lankan cricket